Arara is a census village in Nalbari district, Assam, India. According to the 2011 Census of India, Arara village has a total population of 2,823 people including 1,444 males and 1,379 females.

The village has a history of being a militancy affected area. In 2006, the security forces killed 2 ULFA militants, Bhupen Lahkar and Hemanta Deka, in Arara.

References 

Villages in Nalbari district